Panikkar is a common spelling of the title of Panicker used in India, specifically in the state of Kerala, which roughly comprises the former (British) Madras Presidency district of Malabar and the princely states of Cochin and Travancore, The title was usually conferred on those who are proficient in Kalaripayattu and majority of them belong to Nair community. 
Achyuta Panikkar, an astronomer of Kerala
Ayyappa Panikkar, (1930–2006), a Malayalam poet, critic.
Kadammanitta Ramakrishnan (1935–2008), an Indian writer
Madhava Panikkar, one of the Niranam Poets
Sankara Panikkar, one of the Niranam Poets
Sean Panikkar (born 1981), American operatic tenor
Rama Panikkar, one of the Niranam Poets
Kavalam Madhava Panikkar (1894–1963), Indian diplomat and writer
Kavalam  Narayan Panikkar (1928-2016), dramatist and poet
K. N. Panikkar (born 1936), Indian historian
Raimon Panikkar (1918–2010), a Catalan scholar  

Note: The main article is under Panicker, although that is not the most common of the many possible spellings of this name.

Indian surnames